Gordon Roger Parks Jr. (December 7, 1934April 3, 1979) was an American film director, best known for the 1972 film Super Fly.

Life and career
Parks was born to Sally Alvis and photographer and director Gordon Parks in Minneapolis in 1934. The younger Parks followed in his father's footsteps after his father had success with the blaxploitation hit Shaft (1971).

Parks was killed with three others when their small airplane crashed after takeoff near Nairobi, Kenya, where they had gone to make a film. He was 44 years old.

Filmography 
Super Fly (1972)
Three the Hard Way (1974)
Thomasine & Bushrod (1974)
Aaron Loves Angela (1975)
The Bushtrackers (1980) (started filming 1979 as Revenge; Gary Strieker finished)

References

External links 

Getty Images

1934 births
1979 deaths
African-American film directors
Victims of aviation accidents or incidents in Kenya
Blaxploitation film directors
Film directors from Minnesota
20th-century African-American people